Václav Pletka (born June 8, 1979) is a Czech professional ice hockey player. He plays left wing for HC České Budějovice in the Czech Extraliga. He played in one National Hockey League (NHL) game with the Philadelphia Flyers.

Playing career
He was drafted in the seventh round, 208th overall, of the 1999 NHL Entry Draft by the Philadelphia Flyers. Pletka played two seasons in the Czech Extraliga for HC Oceláři Třinec before coming to North America. He played in Philadelphia for two seasons, appearing in 132 games with the Philadelphia Phantoms of the American Hockey League, and one NHL game with the Flyers during the 2001–02 NHL season.

For the 2002–03 season, Pletka returned to his native Czech Republic to rejoin HC Oceláři Třinec.  In the 2005–06 season, he moved to HC Bílí Tygři Liberec of the Czech Extraliga, and also appeared in five games with HC Dynamo Moscow of the Russian Hockey Super League.

Career statistics

See also
List of players who played only one game in the NHL

External links
 

1979 births
Living people
Czech ice hockey left wingers
Czech expatriate ice hockey players in Russia
HC Bílí Tygři Liberec players
Motor České Budějovice players
HC Dynamo Moscow players
HC Oceláři Třinec players
Sportspeople from Mladá Boleslav
Philadelphia Flyers draft picks
Philadelphia Flyers players
Philadelphia Phantoms players
Czech expatriate ice hockey players in the United States